Nodilittorina pyramidalis, commonly known as a pyramid periwinkle, is a species of sea snail, a marine gastropod mollusk in the family Littorinidae, the winkles or periwinkles.

The subspecies Nodilittorina pyramidalis pascua Rosewater, 1970 is a synonym of Echinolittorina pascua (Rosewater, 1970)

Description
The pyramid periwinkle is small, ranging from 2.5 cm to less than 1 cm in length. It is pale grey in colour, with two rows of nodules on the central whirl of its body which are a pale buff colour. 

It lives on or above the high tide line, usually clinging to vertical surfaces. Many individuals will cluster together in crevices to maintain moisture.

Distribution
Pyramid periwinkles are endemic to Australia and can be found in abundance on both the east and west coasts.

References

 Liu, J.Y. [Ruiyu] (ed.). (2008). Checklist of marine biota of China seas. China Science Press. 1267 pp

External links
 Quoy J.R.C. & Gaimard J.P. (1832-1835). Voyage de découvertes de l'"Astrolabe" exécuté par ordre du Roi, pendant les années 1826-1829, sous le commandement de M. J. Dumont d'Urville. Zoologie. 
 Gmelin J.F. (1791). Vermes. In: Gmelin J.F. (Ed.) Caroli a Linnaei Systema Naturae per Regna Tria Naturae, Ed. 13. Tome 1(6). G.E. Beer, Lipsiae [Leipzig. pp. 3021-3910]
 Reid, D. G.; Williams, S. T. (2004). The subfamily Littorininae (Gastropoda, Littorinidae) in the temperate Southern Hemisphere: the genera Nodilittorina, Austrolittorina and Afrolittorina. Records of the Australian Museum. 56: 75-122

Littorinidae
Gastropods described in 1833